I-2K is a satellite bus developed by Indian Space Research Organisation (ISRO), and marketed by Antrix Corporation. It is a standard bus for 2,000 kg class satellites; the 'I' in I-2K stands for INSAT, a group of communication satellites developed and launched by ISRO. The satellite buses developed by ISRO are specifically developed for small and medium weight satellites. I-2K spacecraft bus can supply DC power up to 3000 watts. I-2K platform is targeted towards satellites in liftoff mass in range of 1500–2500 kg.

List of satellites launched using I-2K platform
 INSAT series (3B  3C  3D  3DR  3E  4C  4CR)
 IRS series (1C  1D  P3)
 GSAT series (1  2  3 (EDUSAT)  4  5P  6  6A   7   7A  9  14  31)
 HYLAS-1

Features of I-2K
 Launch Mass: .
 Dimensions: 1.65 * 1.53m in plan & 3.0m in height.
 Dry Mass: .
 Payload Mass: .
 Total Power: 2800 W.
 Payload Power: 2400 W.
 Transponder: 12 - 18.
 Mission Life: 12 - 15 Years.

See also

 Comparison of satellite buses

References

External links 
 Antrix Corp. Satellite subsystems

Indian Space Research Organisation
Satellite buses